EuropaBio ("The European Association for Bioindustries") is Europe's largest and most influential biotech industry group, whose members include leading large-size healthcare and industrial biotechnology companies. EuropaBio is located in Brussels, Belgium. The organisation was initiated in 1996 to represent the interests of the biotechnology industry at the European level, and therefore influence legislation that serves the interests of biotechnology companies in Europe.

Activity and goals
EuropaBio is engaged in dialogue with the European Parliament, the European Commission, and the Council of Ministers to influence legislation on biotechnology.

EuropaBio represents the three traditional sectors of the biotech industry. 
 White or industrial biotechnology is the application of biotechnology for industrial purposes, including manufacturing, alternative energy (or "bioenergy") biofuels, and biomaterials.
 Red or healthcare biotechnology is the application of biotechnology for the production of medicines and therapies.
 Green or agrifood biotechnology is a collection of technologies using plant organisms and plant cells for the production or transformation of food, biomaterials and energy.

EuropaBio's stated goals are:
 promoting an innovative, coherent, and dynamic biotechnology-based industry in Europe;
 advocating free and open markets and the removal of barriers to competitiveness with other areas of the world;
 committing to an open, transparent, and informed dialogue with all stakeholders about the ethical, social, and economic aspects of biotechnology and its benefits;
 championing the socially responsible use of biotechnology to ensure that its potential is fully used to the benefit of humans and their environment.

EuropaBio's primary focus is the European Union but because of the global character of the biotech business, it also represents its members in transatlantic and worldwide forums.

Organisation
EuropaBio has a board of management made up of representatives from among its industry members. Since September 2020, Andrew Topen Novartis is chairman of the board.

The board is assisted by sectoral councils representing the main segments of EuropaBio – healthcare (red biotech), and industrial (white biotech).

Experts from member companies and national associations participate in EuropaBio's working groups which cover a very wide range of issues and areas of concern of biotech enterprises.

Since November 2020 EuropaBio Director General is Dr. Claire Skentelbery.

Members
In 2021, the association represents 79 corporate and associate members and BioRegions, and 17 national biotechnology associations in turn representing over 1800 biotech SMEs.

See also
 CropLife International
 European Federation of Biotechnology (EFB)
 European Federation of Pharmaceutical Industries and Associations (EFPIA)
 Genetically modified food controversies
 Regulation of the release of genetic modified organisms

Citations

References 
Transforming Europe’s position on GM food - ambassadors programme executive summary The Guardian, Thursday 20 October 2011, Guardian News and Media Limited.
Biotech group bids to recruit high-profile GM 'ambassadors' John Vidal and Hanna Gersmann, The Guardian, Thursday 20 October 2011, Guardian News and Media Limited.
Draft letter from EuropaBio to potential GM ambassadors The Guardian, Thursday 20 October 2011, Guardian News and Media Limited.

External links
 EuropaBio
 Biotechnology in the EU
 Biotech Informa
 BIO
 GMO Compass

Biotechnology organizations
Lobbying organizations
Pan-European trade and professional organizations
Organizations established in 1996
Organisations based in Belgium